James Raymond Leonard Sr. (February 14, 1910 – November 28, 1993) was an American football running back in the National Football League (NFL) for the Philadelphia Eagles, as well as the head coach for the Pittsburgh Steelers in 1945.

Leonard was a two sport star at the University of Notre Dame during the 1930s, both as a pitcher in baseball and a fullback in football.  After Notre Dame he played for the Philadelphia Eagles for three seasons and was team captain in 1935 and 1936.  He left the Eagles to restart the football program at Saint Francis College in Loretto, Pennsylvania in 1937.

In 1942 he joined the NFL again as a staff coach for the Pittsburgh Steelers, then served as an assistant at the College of the Holy Cross in 1943 before returning to the Steelers as head coach during the 1945 campaign.  In 1947 he restarted the football program at Saint Francis College in Loretto, Pennsylvania. It was stopped because of World War II. He finished his career as the head coach of Villanova University from 1949 to 1950.

Head coaching record

College

References

External links
 New York Times obit of Leonard
 
 

1910 births
1993 deaths
American football fullbacks
American football quarterbacks
Holy Cross Crusaders football coaches
Notre Dame Fighting Irish baseball players
Notre Dame Fighting Irish football players
Philadelphia Eagles players
Pittsburgh Steelers coaches
Saint Francis Red Flash football coaches
Villanova Wildcats football coaches
Sportspeople from Philadelphia
People from Salem County, New Jersey
Coaches of American football from Pennsylvania
Players of American football from Philadelphia
Pittsburgh Steelers head coaches